Truyện tranh (Chữ Hán: 傳幀) means comic in Vietnamese (aka Vietnamese Comics). This term has the English name Viet comics created by Floral Age Bimonthly magazine in the 1960s to refer to comics originating in Vietnam. It is sometimes called by the older name Mạn họa (Chữ Hán: 漫畫). In Vietnamese sometimes it will be called by longer names such as: "Truyện tranh Việt Nam", "truyện tranh Việt", "truyện tranh nội", "truyện tranh ta", "truyện tranh trong nước",... to distinguish it from other types of foreign comics such as: "Truyện tranh Âu Mỹ" (Western comics),  "truyện tranh Nhật Bản" (Manga),...

History

Pre-1900

 
During the medieval period, Truyện tranh were often called mạn họa (漫畫), liên-hoàn họa (連環畫, sequential drawings) or phong-tục họa (風俗畫, custom drawings), and were influenced by China and sometimes India. They illustrated philosophy or stories and were printed using woodcuts. There were some drawings  called "moral books" (Luân-lý giáo-khoa thư) for the education of women.

French Indochina (1900–1953)

After the establishment of French Indochina, printing technology developed enough that books and newspapers became more common. Viet comics appeared gradually as cartoons called hoạt kê họa (滑稽畫), hí họa (戲畫) or biếm họa (貶畫).

In the 1930s during the Westernization movement, Viet comics became an independent art with numerous artists and readers. Customs & Mores Weekly (Phong-Hóa tuần-báo) and Today Weekly (Ngày-Nay tuần-báo) published cartoons such as Bang Bạnh - Xã Xệ - Lý Toét. The weekly newspaper Cậu-Ấm tuần-báo featured the "Three adventurous kids" (Ba đứa trẻ mạo-hiểm), Drake Weekly (Vịt-Đực tuần-báo) published sequential drawings that often satirized Annamese writers and the Indochinese government, especially the Governors-General. Viet comics were called chuyện bằng tranh (stories by drawings).

After World War II, there were propaganda comics against the occupying French forces. In Hanoi and Saigon there were  comics what based on romance novels or knightly tales. Some comics were on the topic of Vietnamese history and mythology.

 Nguyễn Tường Tam (Đông Sơn)
 Lê Minh Ðức (Bút Sơn)
 Nguyễn Gia Trí (Raitơ)
 Tô Ngọc Vân (Tô Tử, Ái Mĩ)
 Nguyễn Thứ Lễ (Lê Ta)
 Nguyễn Tường Long (Tứ Ly)
 Bùi Xuân Phái

Northern and Southern Vietnam (1954–1975)

Floral Age Bimonthly (established in 1962) called Truyện tranh as Tranh-truyện Việt-nam (Vietnamese pictorial stories).

Topics included family, friendship, adventure, detective stories, science fiction, wuxia, and fairy tales. The works were influenced by French comics, American comics, Hollywood, and even Jin Yong's works.

In the Democratic Republic of Vietnam, comics usually appeared in Pioneer Magazine, Children Magazine and Kim-Đồng books. Northern artists' styles were influenced by Soviet art.
 Đào Sĩ Chu
 Nguyễn Hải Chí (Chóe)
 Võ Hùng Kiệt (ViVi)
 Hướng Dương
 Nguyễn Tài
 Nguyễn Đình
 Đoàn Đức Tiên
 Vịt Mò
 Kiến Vàng

Era of Subsidy (1976–1985)
After Reunification Day, Viet comics' style became less diverse because of censorship and a lack of printing facilities. In the 1980s there were some artists of Kim Đồng Publishing House who began working using inexpensive dó paper. Topics were often chosen to avoid censorship.

 Ngô Mạnh Lân
 Hoàng Dzự (Dzím)

Era of Reform (1986–2006)
The most famous artist was Nguyễn Hùng Lân, whose popular comics  included Hero Hesman, Vietnamese supermen, Tý Quậy, and Vietnamese fairytales. Many artists borrowed topics and characters from international comics and animated films for imitating. Examples include Well, Just You Wait!, Superman, Jurassic Park and Tom and Jerry.

 Nguyễn Hùng Lân
 Nguyễn Phước Vĩnh Khoa (VINK)
 Nguyễn Hà Bắc
 Phạm Minh Trí
 Nguyễn Thái Hùng
 Vũ Kim Dũng
 Đào Hải

Era of Development (2007 to now)
Youth Laughs Monthly, Hoa Học Trò Weekly and Truyện Tranh Trẻ Magazine (Youth Publishing House) continue to produce comics. Some of the work is influenced by manga, manhwa, and manhua.

In 2013, the historical comic The Holy Dragon Imperator (Long thần tướng) created by Nguyễn Thành Phong and Nguyễn Khánh Dương became a successful crowd-funding project. The comic earned a Silver Award at Japan's 2016 International MANGA Awards. Then there are many other Viet comics were published using the crowd-funding method. For example "Bad Luck" by Châu Chặt Chém, "Gateway to Underworld" (Địa Ngục Môn) by Can Tiểu Hy. "Gateway to Underworld" also earned a Silver Award at Japan's 2017 International MANGA Awards.

Viet comics in this era is full of historical and Vietnamese culture. The "Holy Dragon Imperator" has Trần Quang Đức as a Historical Consultant and main character in "Gateway to Underworld" wear Áo dài (Vietnamese traditional costume).
 Marcelino Truong
 Tạ Huy Long
 Thiết Kiện

See also

 Literature of Vietnam
 Vietnamese animation

References

External links
 A Vietnamese family's refugee story, told through comics
 Awakening Luc-van-Tien fairytale after 100 years